Kymi Airfield is an airfield in Kotka, Finland. The Karhulan ilmailukerho Aviation Museum is located at the airfield.

History
First airplane landed in field in 1943.

See also
List of airports in Finland

References

External links

 VFR Suomi/Finland – Kymi Airfield
 Lentopaikat.net – Kymi Airfield 
 Karhula Flying Club – Kymi Airfield 
 Kotka Aviation Club – Kymi Airfield 

Airports in Finland
Kotka
Buildings and structures in Kymenlaakso